Curtis. C. Harris is the head of the Molecular Genetics and Carcinogenesis Section and chief of the Laboratory of Human Carcinogenesis at the Center for Cancer Research of the National Cancer Institute, NIH.

Harris graduated from University of Kansas with a BA in zoology in 1965, and an MD in 1969. He was an internal medicine intern at UCLA hospital in 1969. He did research and completed his medical oncology training at NCI and Washington Veterans Hospital. Since 1981, he has been head of the Molecular Genetics and Carcinogenesis Section and chief of the Laboratory of Human Carcinogenesis. He is also a lecturer of medicine and oncology at Georgetown University School of Medicine. He has published more than 700 journal articles and has been awarded 30 patents.

His current research focuses on Precision Medicine of Cancer and Aging.

He is internationally recognized for his paradigm-shifting research on environmental, genetic and epigenomic causes of human carcinogenesis. His research career spans over half a century. During this time, he has made significant breakthroughs in our understanding of environmental mutagenesis and carcinogenesis. Through this research, and his extensive service to the national and international scientific community, Harris has made, and continues to make, an exceptional contribution to the improvement of human health. He is also a co-author of the international spy novel High Hand using a pseudonym Curtis J. James.

Research
Harris has made many major discoveries in cancer research. One of the most notable is his seminal work describing the first-known molecular link between an environmental carcinogen, aflatoxin B1, and a specific mutation at codon 249 of the p53-encoding TP53 gene in hepatocellular carcinoma (Nature 350:427, 1991 and web of science). This discovery was truly paradigm-shifting and helped shape the field of Environmental and Molecular Epidemiology. It was selected by the AACR as a Centennial Landmark in Cancer Research. In addition, his paper on the TP53 mutation spectrum is the among the most highly cited in the biomedical research field, with over 9,000 citations and web of science (Science 253:49, 1991). These findings have had, and continue to have, a major impact in cancer risk assessment and biomarker discovery for cancer prevention, diagnosis and prognosis. These advances have been a cornerstone to molecular medicine and the improvement of health outcomes.

A major strength of Harris' research strategy are his insightful and innovative investigations of mechanistic, translational, and functional links between population and basic science research. When the focus of cancer research was on in human vitro and in vitro animal models, he pioneered investigations of carcinogen metabolism, DNA damage, and DNA repair and mutagenesis in humans and in human tissues (e.g., Science 194:1067, 1976; Cancer Res 44:2855, 1984). Many of these significant studies were among the first to highlight the deleterious effects of tobacco carcinogens and their damage to human health (e.g., Cancer Res. 33: 2842–2848, 1973; Nature 247: 48–49, 1974, Nature 252: 68–69, 1974), providing an evidence base for tobacco control policies. Moreover, he led the development of first-in-kind in vitro models of human bronchial epithelial cells from patient explants (e.g., Cancer Res. 36: 1003–1010, 1976, Nature 252: 68–69, 1974). This work was pivotal to the investigation of cellular transformation, and these models continue to be used in research today, a testament to their foundational role in human mutagenesis and carcinogenesis research and the pioneering nature of Harris' research. In parallel, he has extensively investigated p53 functions in the regulation of DNA repair, apoptosis, senescence, and tumorigenicity (e.g., Nat Genet. 10:188, 1995; Nat Med. 4:137,1998; Nat Cell Biol 11:1135, 2009; Nat Cell Biol, 12: 1205, 2010) and recently a microbiome – TP53 mutation interaction in human lung cancer, Genome Biology:19: 123–29, 2018.

Decades prior to the recent discovery of mutant TP53 cells in esophageal tissue (Cell Stem Cell 25:321-41, 2019; Science 362:911-17, 2018), Drs. Peter Cerruti and Curtis Harris, using the novel and highly sensitive TP53 mutational load assay, discovered TP53 mutant DNA in non-malignant lung and plasma in tobacco smokers (PNAS 97: 12770–5, 2000; Science 264: 1317–19, 1994; Cancer Res. 66: 8309–17, 2000). In the past decade, Harris has been a leader in the study of not just TP53 mutations, but TP53 isoforms and their important contributions to senescence, aging and cancer (Fujita K, et al., Nat Cell Biol 11:1135–41, 2009; Mondal A, et al., J Clin Invest 123:5247-57, 2013; Turnquist C. et al., Cell Death Differ 23: 1515–28,2016; Hirokawa I. et al., Cell Death Differ 24: 1017–28, 2017; Von Muhlinen N., et al., Oncogene 37: 2379–93, 2018; Mondal, AM. et al., Cell Death and Dis 9: 750–804, 2018; Turnquist C. et al., Neuro Oncology 21: 474–85, 2019). These recent discoveries transcend many disciplines, increasing their potential to impact human health, specifically in terms of neurological degenerative diseases and premature aging. Collectively, Harris' studies substantively contribute to both our understanding of environmental mutagenesis and carcinogenesis as well as how these discoveries can translate to improve human health.

Translational Discoveries in Cancer Biomarkers: Harris' strategy is to identify mechanistic and statistically independent biomarkers of cancer risk, diagnosis, prognosis, and therapeutic outcome, with the validation of results in multiple ethic and geographic cohorts. One mechanistic facet of these studies is chronic inflammation, a feature of the internal exposome (initially described by Chris Wild, Cancer Epi Biomarkers Prev 14: 1847, 2005) and an established cancer risk factor. He discovered that increased levels of circulating interleukins are predictors of cancer risk, diagnosis, and prognosis of lung cancer patients (JNCI 99:1401, 2007; JNCI 103:1112, 2011). He also identified microRNAs associated with both diagnosis and prognosis of lung cancer (Cancer Cell 9:189, 2006; Clin Cancer Res 17: 1875, 2011) and prognosis and therapeutic outcome of colon cancer (JAMA 299:425, 2008). These were pioneering studies that have since been validated in many studies around the world. In addition, he discovered that combinations of DNA methylation, microRNAs, and proteins (e.g. inflammation-related) produced by human lung, colon, and esophageal carcinomas are robust cancer prognostic classifiers (PNAS 106:12085, 2009; Clin Cancer Res 15:5878, 2009; Clin Cancer Res 15:6192, 2009; Clin Cancer Res 16:5824, 2010; Clin Cancer Res 17:1875, 2011; Int J Cancer 132:2901, 2013; Cancer Res 73:3821, 2013, J of Thoracic Oncology, 10: 1037–1048, 2015). Importantly, these studies identified early-stage lung and colon cancers that have poor prognoses due to the likelihood of undetected micrometastasis.

Harris continues to innovate. Over the past ten years, he has conducted several first-in-kind studies of the human metabolome and how it contributes to cancer risk assessment, cancer diagnosis and the accurate identification of early stage lung cancer patients at high-risk of tumor recurrence (Cancer Res. 74: 3259–3270, 2014; Cancer Epidemiology, Biomarkers & Prevention 25(6); 978–86, 2016). Moreover, in a representative example of his integrative methods, he is now forging a new direction in the field by trying to understand the mechanistic foundation between the metabolome with lung cancer.

Accomplishments
His accomplishments have earned him the ACS.AACR Cancer Epidemiology, Biomarker and Prevention Award, AACR Princess Takamatsu Award, the Oschner Award relating to Smoking and Health from the American College of Physicians, the Deichmann Award from the International Union of Toxicology, the Environment Mutagenesis and Genome Award, and the Distinguished Service Medal—the highest honor of the U.S. Public Health Service.

In addition to these important pioneering findings, Harris' contribution to the field has extended to participation on numerous Boards, International Agency for Research on Cancer (IARC) monographs, and international advisory boards. These roles speak to the high esteem in which is opinion is held around the world. Moreover, it demonstrates his deep commitment to the improvement of human health by translating and communicating science to the public domain. He has been an expert witness at hearings concerning OSHA Regulations on the Identification, Classification and Regulation of Toxic Substances Posing a Potential Occupational Carcinogenic Risk, a member of the technical review committee for the USPHS Surgeon General Report on Harmful Effects of Smokeless Tobacco and was a contributing a to the Surgeon General's 2004 seminal report on the Health Consequences of Smoking. Harris has also been a member of the Scientific Advisory Council at IARC. Moreover, he has demonstrated a steadfast from the 1980s to the present commitment on the Advisory Committee and honored consultant to the Radiation Effects Research Foundation in Hiroshima Japan, an organization dedicated to understanding the health consequences of radiation exposure among survivors of atomic bombs. These highlights are just a few examples of his outstanding contributions in the application of the principles and techniques of environmental mutagenesis and genomics to the protection of human health. He cofounded the Aspen Cancer Conference, a non-profit organization, in 1985 with Dr. Ben Trump where he serves as chairman of the board of directors.

His exceptional record of research accomplishment has been well-recognized by the scientific community with over 90,000 citations and H-index of over 140. He is a valued collaborator with both American and international scientists. In addition to receiving the awards mentioned above, he continues to be invited to present keynote and distinguished lectures at international conferences, including the AACR Frontiers of Cancer Prevention and AACR Chemistry in Cancer Research, most recently at the 11th Annual APRU Global Health Conference. He has served in elected leadership posts in the scientific community, including Chairman of the Program Committee of the AACR Annual Meeting; member of the AACR's board of directors, Nominating Committee and many Award Committees; and chairman of the board of directors and Chairman of the Scientific Program Advisory Board for the Keystone Symposia of Molecular and Cellular Biology. He is also since 1984 to recent the Editor-in Chief of the journal Carcinogenesis. He is an outstanding mentor and has successfully mentored more than one hundred and seventy young scientists. Moreover, he has trained a new generation of scientists in the field of environmental and molecular epidemiology, a field he pioneered. For these accomplishments, he received the NCI Outstanding Mentor Award.

He has successfully intertwined cancer epidemiology with pioneering studies of chemical carcinogenesis, mutagenesis, cellular transformation, and precision medicine, thereby uniquely advancing all of these fields. He has promoted human health by proving evidence-based recommendations for the control of carcinogens and by being a thought leader.

Examples of Awards and accolades
 NSF Research Participation Awardee and Gifted Student Program, University of Kansas, (1963–1965)
 Commendation Medal, USPHS Honor Award, (1979)
 Medical Alumni Scholar and lecturer, first to be awarded, University of Kansas School of Medicine, (1982)
 NCI Equal Employment Opportunity Special Recognition Award, (1983)
Fellow of the American Society for Clinical Investigation (1984) 
Member, board of directors, (1984) American Association for Cancer Research
 Meritorious Service Award, USPHS, (1986)
 Keynote Address, Princess Takamatsu Symposium, (1991)
 Fellow, American Society of Clinical Investigation, (1992)
 Alton Ochsner Award Relating Smoking and Health, Alton Ochsner Medical Foundation and American College of Chest Physicians, (1993)
 Keynote Address, Japanese Research Society for Gastrointestinal Cancers, (1993)
 Keynote Address, Annual Meeting, Chinese Oncology Society, (1994)
 Keynote Address, Beatson International Cancer Conference, (1995)
 Walter Hubert Award and lecturer, British Association for Cancer Research, Nottingham, (1995)
 Don Coffey Award and lecturer, Society for Basic Urological Research, Las Vegas, (1995)
 Keynote Address, 5th International Inhalation Symposium, Hannover, (1995)
 Keynote Address, Japanese Lung Cancer Society, (1995)
Walter Hubert Award: British Association for Cancer Research (1995) 
 Lewis M. Schiffer Memorial Award and lecturer, Cell Proliferation Society, Toledo, (1996)
 Bob Champion Award and lecturer, British Oncological Association, (1996)
Lewis M. Schiffer Memorial Award and lecturer, Cell Proliferation Society (1996)
Bob Champion Award and lecturer, British Oncological Association (1996)
 Elizabeth and James Miller Distinguished Lecturer, Rutgers University, New Jersey, (1997)
 Robert Greenfield Memorial Lecturer, University of Nebraska, (1998)
 Federal Technology Transfer Award, (1998)
 Distinguished Lectureship, Japanese Foundation for Cancer Research, Tokyo, (1998)
 Identified as one of the 50 most cited scientists in biomedical research in the 1990s (ISI Science Watch, March 1998)
 Keynote Address, 2nd International Congress on Gastroenterological Carcinogenesis, Ulm, (1999)
 Charles Heidelberger Award, International Society on Gastroenterological Carcinogenesis, Ulm, (1999)
Distinguished Service Medal, highest award of the US Public Health Service (1999)
 Gerald N. Wogan Lecturer, Massachusetts Institute of Technology, (2000) 
 Keynote Address, Molecular Epidemiology of Human Cancer Conference, International Agency for Research on Cancer, Lyon, (2000)
 Honorary Member (three foreign scientists are selected each year), Japanese Cancer Association, Tokyo (2001) 
 Award of Merit, Princess Takamatsu Cancer Research Fund, Japan, (2002)
 Award of Merit, Princess Takamatsu Cancer Research Foundation (2002)
 Keynote Address, Environmental Health Conference, Lancaster, (2003)
Fellow of the American Association for the Advancement of Science (2003)
 Keynote Address, Tenth International Toxicology Congress, Finland, (2004)
 Keynote Address, Environmental Mutagen Society United Kingdom, Bradford, (2005) 
 Keynote Address, International Symposium, Chronic Oxidative Stress and Cancer: Mechanisms, Biomarkers and Prevention, German Cancer Research Center, Heidelberg, 2005
 Keynote Address and Visiting Professor: Frontiers in Biomedical Research, Hong Kong School of Medicine, Hong Kong, (2005)
 Presidential Lecture, International Liver Congress, Shanghai, (2006)
 Keynote Address, Microenvironment and Cancer Symposium, Japanese Foundation Cancer Research, Tokyo, (2006)
 State of the Art Address, International Liver Cancer Association, Barcelona, (2007)
NCI Outstanding Mentor Award (2007) 
 AACR-Princess Takamatsu Award, AACR Annual Meeting, Denver, CO, (2009)
 Keynote Address, Hiroshima Cancer Symposium, Hiroshima, Japan, (2009)
 NCI Merit Award, (2009)
 Distinguished Professor Lecture, Johns Hopkins University, School of Medicine, Baltimore, MD, (2010)
 Provost Distinguished Lecture, (Inaugural lecture), M.D. Anderson Cancer Center, Houston, TX, (2010)
 Ben Trump Memorial Lecture, Aspen Cancer Conference, Aspen, CO, (2010)
 Distinguished Lecture, Frontiers of Cancer Prevention, AACR Conference, Philadelphia, PA, (2010)
 Keynote Address, Chemistry in Cancer Research: The Biological Chemistry of Inflammation as a Cause of Cancer, AACR Conference, San Diego, CA (2011)
 NCI Outstanding Mentor Award, (2013)
 ILCA Nelson Fausto Award, International Liver Cancer Association, (2014)
 1st Allan Conney Memorial Lecture, Rutgers University, (2014) 
 AACR- American Cancer Society Award for Research Excellence in Cancer Epidemiology and Prevention and Lecture, San Diego, CA, (2014)
 Keynote Address, p53 Isoform Conference, Aix-en Provence, France, (2015)
 Keynote Address, Japan Lung Cancer Society, Yokohama, Japan, (2015)
 Distinguished Medical Alumnus Award, Kansas University School of Medicine, Kansas City, KS, (2016)
 Plenary Lecture, 8th Princess Chulabhorn International Science Congress, Environmental Health: Inter-linkage among the Environment, Chemicals and Infectious Agents, Bangkok, Thailand, (2016)
 Plenary Lecture, Precision Medicine and Lung Cancer Biomarker, AACR, Washington, DC, (2017)
 Keynote Address, 2017 Genetic Toxicology Association (GTA) Meeting, Newark, DE, (2017)
 Keynote Speaker, 3rd International p53 Isoform Workshop, Bergen, Norway, (2017)
 Keynote Speaker, 11th Annual APRU Global Health Conference, Manila, Philippines, (2017)
 Keynote Speaker, International GYN Cancer Conference, Kyoto, Japan, (2018)
 Plenary Lecture, Princess Chulabhorn Symposium, Bangkok, Thailand, (2019)
 Keynote Address, International Cell Senescence Association, Athens, Greece (2019)
 State-of-the-Art Lecture, 36th Annual Meeting of the Germany Working Community on the Study of Liver (ASL), Mainz, Germany, (2020)
 Annual Award Environment Mutagenesis and Genome Society (2020)
 Fellow, Academy of AACR (2021)

References

Living people
American oncologists
Cancer researchers
University of Kansas alumni
1943 births